Creola may refer to the following places in the United States:

Creola, Alabama, an incorporated city in Mobile County
Creola, Louisiana, an incorporated village in Grant Parish
Creola, Ohio, an unincorporated community in Vinton County

See also
 Creole (disambiguation)
 Lethe creola, a species of brush-footed butterfly